Spodnje Negonje is a settlement in the Municipality of Rogaška Slatina in eastern Slovenia. It lies just north of the town of Rogaška Slatina. The entire area is part of the traditional region of Styria. It is now included in the Savinja Statistical Region.

Name
The name Spodnje Negonje means 'lower Negonje', distinguishing the village from neighboring Zgornje Negonje (literally, 'upper Negonje'), which lies at an elevation about  higher. The name Negonje is probably a possessive form of the personal name *Negojinъ, elided from *Negojin'e (selo) 'Negojinъ's (village)', referring to an early inhabitant of the place.

References

External links
Spodnje Negonje on Geopedia

Populated places in the Municipality of Rogaška Slatina